Jamie Delgado and Jonathan Marray defeated Yves Allegro and Andreas Beck in the final 6–3, 6–4.

Seeds

Draw

Draw

External links
 Main Draw

Aegon GB Pro-Series Bath - Doubles
2011 Men's Doubles